Mers-les-Bains is a commune in the Somme department in Hauts-de-France in northern France.

Geography

This ‘bathing station’ (seaside resort) has both pebbles and sand (at low tide) on the  beach and high chalk cliffs. With its neighbouring towns Eu and Le Tréport so close by, it appears as one large conglomeration. They are collectively known as the 'three sister-towns' (les trois villes soeurs)."

Much of the older part of town developed in the heyday of seaside bathing, during the latter part of the 19th century. As a consequence, the fine villas that were developed in those times are now subject to preservation orders. Any refurbishment must be in the same materials and colours as the original work. No plastic doors or roller shutters are allowed.

History
Mers-les-Bains’ does not have much history. There are one or two noble families known to have been seigneurs of places within the commune; The coat-of-arms, carved in stone, of the Mython family of Froideville adorns one of the Mayor's offices today. The Lucas family of Rompval, the Lattaignant seigneurs of Blengues, and the Torcy family, seigneurs of Mers-les-Bains are all mentioned in archives. Some parts of their coat-of-arms can still be seen today, as part of the official badge of the town, adopted in December 1962.
Once just a small fishing port, the seaside ‘bathing station’ grew partly because of the railway line that ran from Paris to Tréport. Entire families could make the 3 hour journey from Paris to discover the benefits of bathing and breathe the fresh, iodized air. Many would eventually buy land and build sumptuous second homes in the town.

Population

Places of interest

 A Calvary, in stone, of St. Maximin, adorned by 4 gargoyles.
 Notre-Dame statue on the cliffs.
 The war memorial. A maple leaf commemorates the liberation of the town by the Canadian Chaudière regiment

Personalities

 Eugène Dabit author of the novel (Hôtel du Nord) was born in Mers-les-Bains
 Antoine Vollon, artist, (b. Lyon 1833 – d. Paris 1900) lived here for many years with his son, Alexis (1865–1940)
 Jules Verne spent holidays here with his family.
 Victor Hugo wrote of his summers here.
 Pierre Lefort, doctor and surgeon was born here in 1767.
 Marie-Josèphe Cotelle-Clère sculptor and artist, left many works to the town, as did the artist
 Jules Noël
 Fernand Fabre, actor from the 1920s, retired here.
 Gustave Eiffel, engineer, spent his holidays here.
 François Coppée, writer,  worked here
 Augustin Chantrel, footballer who played for France in the World Cup of 1938 was born here.
 Bernard Lavalette, comedian and singer, spends weekends here with his wife in their classically designed villa.

Economy and tourism
The Saint-Gobain glass works, considered a world leader in perfume bottle production, is the town's biggest employer. The town depends more and more on its reputation as a seaside resort. A prestigious award ‘The pavillon bleu d'Europe’ was awarded in 2006. Holiday residences are newly built or restored each and every year and the town flourishes.

Sea defences
Mers-les-Bains has suffered from flooding on a regular basis. The army has been often been deployed with sandbags to stem the flow. A more permanent barrier is now being created for the three towns, at a projected cost of 13 million euros. This involves large rocks, transported on barges from Boulogne, being placed at the feet of the cliffs, to create a buffer and so preserve them and prevent further floods.

Fauna
Both herring gulls and black-headed gulls are found in abundance, along with kestrels, in the air on the lookout for prey. This will include mussels, various crabs, shrimps and prawns.

See also
Communes of the Somme department

References

External links

 Old seaside postcards 
 Official town website 
 Office du tourisme 
 Site du Service départemental d'architecture (SDAP) sur les villas classées de Mers les Bains 
 Information on Le Tréport, Eu and Mers les Bains 

Communes of Somme (department)
Seaside resorts in France